The seventeenth government of Israel was formed by Yitzhak Rabin on 3 June 1974, following the resignation of Prime Minister Golda Meir on 11 April and Rabin's election as Labor Party leader on 26 April. It was the first time an Israeli government had been led by a native-born Israeli (although Rabin was born in the British Mandate for Palestine prior to independence).

As well as the 54-seat Alignment (of which the Labor Party was the largest faction, alongside Mapam and the two Labor-affiliated Israeli Arab parties, Progress and Development and the Arab List for Bedouin and Villagers, which merged into the United Arab List towards the end of the Knesset term), Rabin also included the Independent Liberals, who held four seats, and Ratz, which had three. The coalition had only a one-seat majority, with just 61 of the 120 seats in the Knesset, and was the first in Israeli political history to not contain a religious party. This status lasted until 30 October when the National Religious Party (NRP) joined the coalition, taking the number of seats up to 71, although Ratz left on 6 November, reducing the number by three. In forming the government, Rabin dropped the development portfolio.

The government was dissolved by Rabin on 22 December 1976, following the abstention of the NRP on a vote of no confidence regarding an apparent breach of the Sabbath during a ceremony at an Israeli Air Force base, but continued, without the NRP members, who all resigned on 22 December, as a caretaker government until the formation of the eighteenth government following the May 1977 elections. However, following the Dollar Account affair in March 1977, Rabin announced on 6 April that he was resigning as head of the Labor Party, and Minister of Defense Shimon Peres was unanimously elected to succeed him. As Israeli law prohibited resignation from a caretaker government, Rabin suspended himself from his duties as Prime Minister and Peres took his place as an unofficial acting Prime Minister.

Cabinet members

1 Although Rosen, Shem-Tov and Uzan were not members of the Knesset at the time, they had previously been MKs for the Alignment.

2 Although Bar-Lev and Rabinovitz were not MKs at the time, they were later elected to the Knesset on the Alignment list.

3 Ofer committed suicide following the Yadlin affair.

4 Kol and Hausner had been elected to the Knesset on the Independent Liberals list, but resigned their seats after being appointed to the cabinet.

5 Hasani died in office.

References

External links
Eighth Knesset: Government 17 Knesset website

 17
1974 establishments in Israel
1976 disestablishments in Israel
Cabinets established in 1974
Cabinets disestablished in 1976
1974 in Israeli politics
1975 in Israeli politics
1976 in Israeli politics
1977 in Israeli politics
 17